Elachista texanica is a moth of the family Elachistidae. It is found in the United States, where it has been recorded from Texas.

The forewings are dark brown, with scattered lighter yellow scales. There is an orange spot at the base of the dorsal margin and a second, large and ill-defined spot, occupying the apical part of the wing. The hindwings are brownish gray.

References

texanica
Moths described in 1876
Moths of North America